This is a list of Bollywood (Indian Hindi-language) films that have been released in 2018.

Box office collection
The Highest-grossing Bollywood films released in 2018, by worldwide box office gross revenue, are as follows.

January–March

April–June

July–September

October–December

See also
 Lists of Hindi films
 List of Bollywood films of 2019
 List of Bollywood films of 2017

Notes

References

2018
2018 in Indian cinema
Bollywood
2018-related lists